Mike Shanahan (born 1952) is a former American football coach.

Mike Shanahan may also refer to:

Mike Shanahan (ice hockey) (1939–2018), investor and owner of the American hockey franchise, the St. Louis Blues
Mike Shanahan (tight end) (born 1989), American football tight end
Mike Shanahan (writer), British biologist and writer
Michael Shanahan (1943–2014), journalist